Piran (also Romanized as Pīrān; also known as Deh-e Pīrān and Gholām‘alī-ye Pīrān) is a village in Qorqori Rural District, Qorqori District, Hirmand County, Sistan and Baluchestan Province, Iran. At the 2006 census, its population was 573, in 136 families.

References 

Populated places in Hirmand County